Anasimyia distincta, the short-spurred swamp fly, is a rare species of syrphid fly observed in The Northeastern United States and adjacent Canada. Hoverflies can remain nearly motionless in flight. The  adults are also  known as flower flies for they are commonly found on flowers from which they get both energy-giving nectar and protein rich pollen. Larvae of this genus are of the rat-tailed type living in aquatic environments.

References

External links
 Images of Anasimyia distincta on iNaturalist

Eristalinae
Insects described in 1887
Taxa named by Samuel Wendell Williston
Hoverflies of North America